The Greater Toronto Hockey League (GTHL), formerly known as the Metro Toronto Hockey League, is a minor level ice hockey organization based in the Greater Toronto Area of Ontario. The league was founded in 1911 as the Beaches Hockey League by Fred C. Waghorne, Sr., and it is the largest minor hockey organization in the world. The league is sanctioned by the Ontario Hockey Federation and Hockey Canada.

History

Early years
The Greater Toronto Hockey League was founded in 1911 by Frank D. Smith. Its first season consisted of 5 teams and 99 players. Smith was 17 years old when he founded the organization, and would continue to oversee the operation for 50 years. He was elected to the Hockey Hall of Fame in 1962 in part for his contributions to minor hockey in Toronto.

The League's name underwent several changes over its history. Originally called the Beaches League, it was renamed to the Toronto Hockey League (THL) shortly after its inception. It was renamed again in 1972 to the Metropolitan Toronto Hockey League before settling on the current Greater Toronto Hockey League moniker in 1998. The League saw increases in membership during its first few years. During World War I, the then THL maintained its numbers due to having younger age divisions, such as peewee and bantam, where the players were too young to participate in the war. By the 1960s, The league had over 20,000 members on teams across Toronto.

During the summer in 1989, the MTHL and the Ontario Minor Hockey Association (OMHA), broke away from the Ontario Hockey Association (OHA) and formed the Central Canada Hockey Association, due to disagreement with an OHA restructuring proposal which would have limited their voting powers. The dispute ended when the Ontario Hockey Federation (OHF) was established, with equal representation for the OHA, Northern Ontario Hockey Association, MTHL, and OMHA. The OHF was given the mandate to oversee hockey in Ontario, and be a review panel for three years to propose further restructuring if necessary.

The GTHL
In 2011, the Greater Toronto Hockey League and its affiliates consisted of 2,800 teams and around 40,000 players. It is currently the largest youth ice hockey organization in the world in terms of members. The league has expanded its area of operation over the years from primarily the city of Toronto to many of its surrounding municipalities. Currently, there are 51 separate associations that operate under the GTHL. These associations provide teams for the various age groups and divisions that make up the league. Around 275 GTHL alumni have gone on to play in North American professional ice hockey leagues, such as the National Hockey League and the defunct World Hockey Association.

The GTHL is a not-for-profit organization, however its operating costs are high. In 2011, league expenses were in excess of $9 million per year. The high costs of operating teams has been an issue for the league, with some teams having trouble paying for the increasing costs of ice in the Toronto area. The costs for someone to play on a AAA GTHL team, its highest level of play, is approximately $6,000 per player.

In 2011, the GTHL along with Hockey Canada changed its rules regarding hits to the head. Stricter rules were placed on what constituted a hit to the head, and the severity of punishment for instances of it was increased.

Affiliates
The GTHL serves as the parent organization for several other minor hockey leagues.  These leagues coordinate "Select" League play for players in the Toronto area seeking to play at a level below "rep" teams in the GTHL.

 North York Hockey League (NYHL) - Coordinates "select" level programs for the Toronto, Scarborough and North York area.
 Mississauga Hockey League (MHL) - Coordinates "select" and Rep "A" level programs for the Mississauga area.

Levels of play
The GTHL runs competitive leagues at the "rep" levels (AAA, AA, and A), as well as coordinating several affiliates to operate "Select" leagues throughout the city.  Rep hockey in the GTHL begins at "minor Atom" (U9) age and continues through U21. House League and Select programs include children of all ages, extending from Timbits (3 or 4 years of age) all the way to U21.

All hockey is played under "Hockey Canada" rules. There is no body checking allowed at all age groups for "select" and rep "A" level in the GTHL and affiliates. Body checking is permitted for minor bantam (U14) and above for the rep "AA" and rep "AAA" levels.

Notable alumni

Andreas Athanasiou
Sam Bennett
Jordan Binnington
David Bolland
Carl Brewer
Connor Brown
Michael Bunting
Sean Burke
Brent Burns
Mike Cammalleri
Chris Campoli
Anson Carter
Ben Chiarot
Jakob Chychrun
Anthony Cirelli
Casey Cizikas
Paul Coffey
Andrew Cogliano
Lionel Conacher
Trevor Daley
Mike Danton
Jason Dawe
Jack Devine
Max Domi
Kris Draper
Jamie Drysdale
Bill Durnan
Sean Durzi
Ryan Ellis
Ray Emery
MacKenzie Entwistle
Jake Evans
Robby Fabbri
Mario Ferraro
Warren Foegele
Alex Formenton
Mark Friedman 
Sam Gagner
Mark Giordano
Adam Graves
Dougie Hamilton
Barrett Hayton
Orel Hershiser
Bo Horvat
Josh Ho-Sang
Jack Hughes
Quinn Hughes
Zach Hyman
Sheldon Keefe
Chris Kelly
Red Kelly
Greg Kimmerly
Jordan Kyrou
Scott Laughton
Jack LaFontaine
Brendan Lemieux
Eric Lindros
Ryan Lomberg
Frank Mahovlich
Andrew Mangiapane
Mitch Marner
Shawn Matthias
Connor McDavid
Kirk McLean
Michael McLeod
Ryan McLeod
Victor Mete
Rick Middleton
Sean Monahan
Dominic Moore
Matt Moulson
Rick Nash
Darnell Nurse
Jamie Oleksiak
Ryan O'Reilly
Richard Park
Nick Paul
Adam Pelech
Cole Perfetti
Alex Pietrangelo
Owen Power
Bob Pulford
Bill Quackenbush
Taylor Raddysh
Mike Ricci
Brett Ritchie
Nick Ritchie
Jason Robertson
Nick Robertson
Evan Rodrigues
Tyler Seguin
Frank Selke
Brendan Shanahan
Steve Shutt
Wayne Simmonds
Jeff Skinner
Brendan Smith
Gemel Smith
Givani Smith
Reilly Smith
Sid Smith
Jason Spezza
Matt Stajan
Mitchell Stephens
Chris Stewart
Dylan Strome
Ryan Strome
Malcolm Subban
PK Subban
Brandon Tanev
Chris Tanev
John Tavares
Akil Thomas
Owen Tippett
Tyler Toffoli
Philip Tomasino
Joel Ward
Dean Warren
Scott Wedgewood
Kevin Weekes
Tom Wilson
Daniel Winnik

References

External links
GTHL web site

1911 establishments in Ontario
Ice hockey leagues in Toronto
Sports leagues established in 1911
Youth ice hockey leagues in Canada